Julie Van de Velde (born 2 June 1993) is a Belgian racing cyclist, who currently rides for UCI Women's Continental Team . She rode in the women's road race event at the 2018 UCI Road World Championships. In 2019 she won the Flanders Ladies Classic and came second in the general classification at Gracia–Orlová.

References

External links
 

1993 births
Living people
Belgian female cyclists
Olympic cyclists of Belgium
Cyclists at the 2020 Summer Olympics
Place of birth missing (living people)
Sportspeople from Bruges
Cyclists from West Flanders